Guy M. Brandborg (1893–1977) was supervisor of Bitterroot National Forest in Montana from 1935 to 1955 and later became a conservation activist. His campaigns were instrumental in passing the National Forest Management Act of 1976, the most significant policy affecting forestry practices on public lands since the founding of the National Forest Service.

Born in 1893 to a Minnesotan farmer, Guy M. Brandborg began working for the National Forest Service in the summer of 1914 as a seasonal ranger in the Lewis and Clark National Forest. He studied forestry at the ranger training program at The State University of Montana in Missoula, which later changed its name to The University of Montana. After taking on a few other assignments with the Forest Service in Idaho and Montana, Brandborg became supervisor of the Bitterroot National Forest in 1935.

After World War II, to meet increased demands for timber, the Forest Service changed its management outlook from that of caretaker to that of lumber producer. A believer in sustainable practices, Brandborg was alarmed at the increased rate of forest cutting. His management goal was to balance production with conservation so that both forests and jobs would be conserved, and, in his judgment, the Forest Service practices were too exploitative to preserve either for future generations. Brandborg also opposed the Forest Service’s plan to ship logs to mills outside of the immediate area; he preferred to keep those jobs within the local community. He attempted to continue with his own management practices and keep the status quo, but that stance was not favored by the Forest Service, and in 1955 Brandborg retired from his position.

As the Forest Service increased timber harvest, including clearcutting, in the Bitterroots, many in the local community became concerned about the aesthetic and environmental impacts. They turned to Brandborg for help. In what is known as the “Bitterroot Controversy”, he and others challenged the Forest Service through the Bitterroot Resource Conservation and Development program. Under this pressure, the Forest Service responded by contracting a third party—the School of Forestry at the University of Montana—to study the problem. The resulting report found that timber production in the Bitterroots was taking place without consideration of the effects on environment, economy, and aesthetics of the area. It also took a close look at the problems that stem from clear cutting and from forestry management decisions that lack local participation. Although disputes over forestry practices continue, this event sparked major changes to U.S. forestry policies in the 1970s and influenced the passage of the National Forest Management Act of 1976.

Brandborg led several campaigns to change forestry practices during his lifetime. He died in 1977.

References

External links 
The Bitterroot Controversy and the Environmental Movement (foresthistory.org)
Preserving America's Wilderness (American Profile)
Guy M. Brandborg Papers (University of Montana Archives)

Further reading
Swanson, Frederick H. (2011) The Bitterroot and Mr. Brandborg: Clearcutting and the Struggle for Sustainable Forestry in the Northern Rockies. 

1893 births
1977 deaths
Montana State University alumni
American foresters
People from Minnesota